Eisenstadt is a German surname. Notable people with the surname include:

Abraham Hirsch ben Jacob Eisenstadt of Byelostok (1812–1868), Russian rabbi
Benjamin Eisenstadt (1906–1996), American inventor
Debra Eisenstadt, American actress, writer, producer and director
Harry Eisenstat, Major League baseball player
Jill Eisenstadt (born 1963), American novelist
Martin Eisenstadt, fictional "talking head" created by Dan Mirvish and Eitan Gorlin
Meir Eisenstadt (1670–1744), Polish-German rabbi
Mordechai Eisenstadt, Jewish Sabbatean
Samuel Eisenstadt (born 1923), research chairman at Value Line. Co-inventor of Value Line Ranking System for Timeliness
Shmuel Eisenstadt (1923–2010), Israeli sociologist

German-language surnames
Jewish surnames